The Baltimore Orioles 2010 season was the 110th season in franchise history, 57th in Baltimore, and 19th at Oriole Park at Camden Yards.

Offseason 
The Orioles made many significant roster moves prior to the 2010 season. The team parted ways with several contributors from the 2009 season including Aubrey Huff, and Melvin Mora who was the team's longest tenured player. Miguel Tejada returned to the team to replace Mora at third base and brought in Garrett Atkins to play first. The Orioles also looked to improve the pitching staff by trading for veteran Kevin Millwood from the Texas Rangers and signing free agent closer Michael Gonzalez.

Regular season 
Despite some predictions that the Orioles would have one of their best seasons in years (possibly even finishing with a .500 winning average), the Orioles continued to struggle throughout the first half of the season. The Orioles 2010 season got off to a horrendous start the team going 2–16 to start the season, last in the league by some margin and the second-worst in franchise history. On April 12, the team set a then-club record for the lowest paid attendance in Camden Yards history as only 9,129 attended the game versus the Tampa Bay Rays. They would end the month of April 5–18. May would be only slightly better as the team posted a 10–18 record for the month. On June 4, 2010. the Orioles fired manager Dave Trembley after compiling a record of 187 wins and 283 losses since being promoted during the 2007 season. At the time they were on an 8-game losing streak and had the worst record in the league at 15–39. Trembley was replaced by third base coach Juan Samuel on an interim basis.

The managerial change accomplished little as the team's struggles continued under Samuel. Despite sweeping a four-game series from the Texas Rangers in Texas to head into the All-Star break, the Orioles went 29–59 in the first half. The team went 7–19 in the month of July.

On July 29, the Orioles hired Buck Showalter to be the team's full-time manager. He was introduced on August 2 and made his debut on August 3, by which time Samuel's record as manager was 17–34. Showalter chose to wear the number 26 in honor of his friend and former Orioles manager Johnny Oates. It was announced that Juan Samuel would not resume his role as third base coach and would instead take on a new role as a Dominican scout for the team.

With Showalter in the dugout the Orioles went 17–11 in August, their first winning month all season and first winning August since 2004. However, on August 29, the Orioles became the first team to be mathematically eliminated from playoff contention for the MLB 2010 season.

The Orioles finished out the season by going 17–13 in the months of September and October, making the team 34–23 under Showalter. This was the best record of any AL team over the same stretch of time, one commentator stating that "The Orioles had two different seasons. Before Buck and After Buck."

2010 also marked the first time since 2004 that the Orioles improved on their previous season's win total. Their final record for the 2010 season was 66–96.

Roster

Season standings

Record vs. opponents

Game log 

|- bgcolor="ffbbbb"
|- align="center" bgcolor="ffbbbb"
| 1 || April 6 || @ Rays || 4–3 || Soriano (1–0) || Gonzalez (0–1) || || 36,973 || 0–1
|- align="center" bgcolor="ffbbbb"
| 2 || April 7 || @ Rays || 4–3 || Garza (1–0) || Guthrie (0–1) || Soriano (1) || 15,220 || 0–2
|- align="center" bgcolor="bbffbb"
| 3 || April 8 || @ Rays || 5–4 || Matusz (1–0) || Ekstrom (0–1) || Gonzalez (1) || 16,191 || 1–2
|- align="center" bgcolor="ffbbbb"
| 4 || April 9 || Blue Jays || 7–6 || Janssen (2–0) || Gonzalez (0–2) || Gregg (1) || 48,891 || 1–3
|- align="center" bgcolor="ffbbbb"
| 5 || April 10 || Blue Jays || 3–0 || Eveland (1–0) || D. Hernandez (0–1) || Frasor (3) || 21,148 || 1–4
|- align="center" bgcolor="ffbbbb"
| 6 || April 11 || Blue Jays || 5–2 || Janssen (3–0) || Millwood (0–1) || Gregg (2) || 22,499 || 1–5
|- align="center" bgcolor="ffbbbb"
| 7 || April 12 || Rays || 5–1 || Garza (2–0) || Guthrie (0–2) || || 9,129 || 1–6
|- align="center" bgcolor="ffbbbb"
| 8 || April 13 || Rays || 8–6 || Cormier (1–0) || Albers (0–1) || Soriano (2) || 13,731 || 1–7
|- align="center" bgcolor="ffbbbb"
| 9 || April 14 || Rays || 9–1 || Price (2–0) || Bergesen (0–1) || || 10,248 || 1–8
|- align="center" bgcolor="ffbbbb"
| 10 || April 15 || @ Athletics || 6–2 || Sheets (1–0) || D. Hernandez (0–2) || || 17,382 || 1–9 
|- align="center" bgcolor="ffbbbb"
| 11 || April 16 || @ Athletics || 4–2 || Braden (2–0) || Millwood (0–2) || Bailey (1) || 12,225 || 1–10
|- align="center" bgcolor="ffbbbb"
| 12 || April 17 || @ Athletics || 4–3 || Blevins (2–0) || Johnson (0–1) || || 15,072 || 1–11
|- align="center" bgcolor="bbffbb"
| 13 || April 18 || @ Athletics || 8–3 || Matusz (2–0) || Anderson (1–1) || Johnson (1) || 14,451 || 2–11
|- align="center" bgcolor="ffbbbb"
| 14 || April 19 || @ Mariners || 8–2 || Fister (2–1) || Bergesen (0–2) || || 14,528 || 2–12
|- align="center" bgcolor="ffbbbb"
| 15 || April 20 || @ Mariners || 3–1 || Vargas (2–1) || D. Hernandez (0–3) || Aardsma (6) || 15,931 || 2–13
|- align="center" bgcolor="ffbbbb"
| 16 || April 21 || @ Mariners || 4–1 || F. Hernández (2–0) || Millwood (0–3) || || 18,401 || 2–14
|- align="center" bgcolor="ffbbbb"
| 17 || April 23 || @ Red Sox || 4–3 || Delcarmen (1–1) || Albers (0–2) || Papelbon (4) || 37,367 || 2–15
|- align="center" bgcolor="ffbbbb"
| 18 || April 24 || @ Red Sox || 7–6 || Lackey (2–1) || Albers (0–3) || Papelbon (5) || 38,017 || 2–16
|- align="center" bgcolor="bbffbb"
| 19 || April 25 || @ Red Sox || 7–6 || Johnson (1–1) || Atchinson (0–1) || Meredith (1) || 37,102 || 3–16
|- align="center" bgcolor="bbffbb"
| 20 || April 27 || Yankees ||5–4 || Castillo (1–0) || Robertson (0-1) || Simón (1) ||20,536 || 4–16 
|- align="center" bgcolor="ffbbbb"
| 21 || April 28 || Yankees || 8–3 || Sabathia (3–1) || Guthrie (0–3) || || 17,248 || 4–17
|- align="center" bgcolor="ffbbbb"
| 22 || April 29 || Yankees || 4–0 || A. J. Burnett (3–0) || Matusz (2–1) || || 26,439 || 4–18
|- align="center" bgcolor="bbffbb"
| 23 || April 30 || Red Sox || 5–4 (10) || Albers (1–3) || Ramírez (0–1) || || 30,668 || 5–18 
|-

|- bgcolor="ffbbbb"
|- align="center" bgcolor="bbffbb"
| 24 || May 1 || Red Sox || 12–9 || Bergesen (1–2) || Matsuzaka (0–1) || Simón (2) || 35,164 || 6–18
|- align="center" bgcolor="bbffbb"
| 25 || May 2 || Red Sox || 3–2 (10) || Albers (2–3) || Papelbon (1–2) || || 34,255 || 7–18
|- align="center" bgcolor="ffbbbb"
| 26 || May 3 || @ Yankees || 4–1 || Sabathia (4–1) || Guthrie (0–4) || Chamberlain (1) || 41,571 || 7–19
|- align="center" bgcolor="ffbbbb"
| 27 || May 4 || @ Yankees || 4–1 || A. J. Burnett (4–0) || Matusz (2–2) || Chamberlain (2) || 43,260 || 7–20
|- align="center" bgcolor="ffbbbb"
| 28 || May 5 || @ Yankees || 7–5 || Pettitte (4–0) || D. Hernandez (0–4) || Aceves (1) || 43,425 || 7–21
|- align="center" bgcolor="bbffbb"
| 29 || May 6 || @ Twins || 2–0 || Bergesen (2–2) || Pavano (3–3) || Simón (3) || 38,489 || 8–21 
|- align="center" bgcolor="bbffbb"
| 30 || May 8 || @ Twins || 7–3 || Guthrie (1–4) || Liriano (4–1) || || 38,608 || 9–21
|- align="center" bgcolor="ffbbbb"
| 31 || May 8 || @ Twins || 6–1 || Baker (4–2) || Millwood (0–4) || || 38,863 || 9–22
|- align="center" bgcolor="ffbbbb"
| 32 || May 9 || @ Twins || 6–0 || Blackburn (3–1) || Matusz (2–3) || || 38,641 || 9–23
|- align="center" bgcolor="ffbbbb"
| 33 || May 11 || Mariners || 5–1 || Lee (1–1) || D. Hernandez (0–4) || League (1) || 12,614 || 9–24
|- align="center" bgcolor="bbffbb"
| 34 || May 12 || Mariners || 5–2 || Bergesen (3–2) || Rowland-Smith (0–3) || Simón (4) || 11,448 || 10–24
|- align="center" bgcolor="bbffbb"
| 35 || May 13 || Mariners || 6–5 || Hendrickson (1–0) || League (3–3) || Simón (5) || 20,938 || 11–24
|- align="center" bgcolor="bbffbb"
| 36 || May 14 || Indians || 8–1 || Guthrie (2–4) || Masterson (0–4) || || 25,902 || 12–24
|- align="center" bgcolor="ffbbbb"
| 37 || May 15 || Indians || 8–2 || Talbot (5–2) || Simón (0–1) || || 29,545 || 12–25
|- align="center" bgcolor="ffbbbb"
| 38 || May 16 || Indians || 5–1 || Westbrook (2–2) || Hendrickson (1–1) || || 29,323 || 12–26
|- align="center" bgcolor="ffbbbb"
| 39 || May 17 || Royals || 4–3 || Davies (3–2) || Bergesen (3–3) || Soria (10) || 9,299 || 12–27
|- align="center" bgcolor="bbffbb"
| 40 || May 18 || Royals || 4–3 (10) || Simón (1–1) || Bullington (0–1) || || 9,715 || 13–27
|- align="center" bgcolor="ffbbbb"
| 41 || May 19 || @ Rangers || 4–3 || Francisco (5–3) || Meredith (0–1) || || 22,321 || 13–28
|- align="center" bgcolor="ffbbbb"
| 42 || May 20 || @ Rangers || 13–7 || Feldman (2–4) || Matusz (2–4) || || 17,304 || 13–29
|- align="center" bgcolor="bbffbb"
| 43 || May 21 || @ Nationals || 5–3 || D. Hernandez (1–5) || Olsen (2–2) || Simón (6) || 27,378 || 14–29
|- align="center" bgcolor="ffbbbb"
| 44 || May 22 || @ Nationals || 7–6 || Walker (1–0) || Hendrickson (1–2) || Capps (16) || 30,290 || 14–30
|- align="center" bgcolor="ffbbbb"
| 45 || May 23 || @ Nationals || 4–3 (10) || Slaten (2–0) || Meredith (0–2) || || 27,535 || 14–31
|- align="center" bgcolor="bbffbb"
| 46 || May 25 || Athletics || 5–1 || Guthrie (3–4) || Ross (1–3) || || 14,686 || 15–31
|- align="center" bgcolor="ffbbbb"
| 47 || May 26 || Athletics || 6–1 || Cahill (3–2) || Matusz (2–5) || || 19,153 || 15–32
|- align="center" bgcolor="ffbbbb"
| 48 || May 27 || Athletics || 7–5 || Wuertz (2–0) || Hendrickson (1–3) || Bailey (9) || 26,279 || 15–33
|- align="center" bgcolor="ffbbbb"
| 49 || May 28 || @ Blue Jays || 5–0 || Marcum (5–1) || Millwood (0–5) || || 16,360 || 15–34
|- align="center" bgcolor="ffbbbb"
| 50 || May 29 || @ Blue Jays || 5–2 || Cecil (5–2) || Berken (0–1) || Gregg (13) || 16,194 || 15–35
|- align="center" bgcolor="ffbbbb"
| 51 || May 30 || @ Blue Jays || 6–1 || Romero (5–2) || Guthrie (3–5) || || 15,878 || 15–36
|-

|- bgcolor="ffbbbb"
|- align="center" bgcolor="ffbbbb"
| 52 || June 1 || @ Yankees || 3–1 || Vasquez (4–5) || Matusz (2–6) || Rivera (11) || 43,059 || 15–37
|- align="center" bgcolor="ffbbbb"
| 53 || June 2 || @ Yankees || 9–1 || Hughes (7–1) || Bergesen (3–4) || || 44,465 || 15–38
|- align="center" bgcolor="ffbbbb"
| 54 || June 3 || @ Yankees || 6–3 || Sabathia (5–3) || Millwood (0–6) || Rivera (12) || 44,927 || 15–39
|- align="center" bgcolor="ffbbbb"
| 55 || June 4 || Red Sox || 11–0 || Buchholz (8–3) || Tillman (0–1) || || 30,070 || 15–40
|- align="center" bgcolor="ffbbbb"
| 56 || June 5 || Red Sox || 8–2 || Lester (7–2) || Guthrie (3–6) || || 40,001 || 15–41
|- align="center" bgcolor="bbffbb"
| 57 || June 6 || Red Sox || 4–3 (11) || D. Hernandez (2–5) || Okajima (2–2) || || 27,774 || 16–41
|- align="center" bgcolor="ffbbbb"
| 58 || June 8 || Yankees || 12–7 || Hughes (8–1) || Millwood (0–7) || || 23,171 || 16–42
|- align="center" bgcolor="ffbbbb"
| 59 || June 9 || Yankees || 4–2 || Sabathia (6–3) || Tillman (0–2) || Rivera (14) || 16,451 || 16–43
|- align="center" bgcolor="bbffbb"
| 60 || June 10 || Yankees || 4–3 || Arrieta (1–0) || A. J. Burnett (6–4) || D. Hernandez (1) || 27,064 || 17–43
|- align="center" bgcolor="ffbbbb"
| 61 || June 11 || Mets || 5–1 || Dickey (4–0) || Guthrie (3–7) || || 28,554 || 17–44
|- align="center" bgcolor="ffbbbb"
| 62 || June 12 || Mets || 3–1 || Takahashi (5–2) || Matusz (2–7) || F. Rodríguez (13) || 42,248 || 17–45
|- align="center" bgcolor="ffbbbb"
| 63 || June 13 || Mets || 11–4 || Pelfrey (9–1) || Millwood (0–8) || || 24,848 || 17–46
|- align="center" bgcolor="ffbbbb"
| 64 || June 14 || @ Giants || 10–2 || Sánchez (5–5) || Tillman (0–3) || || 33,822 || 17–47
|- align="center" bgcolor="bbffbb"
| 65 || June 15 || @ Giants || 4–1 || Arrieta (2–0) || J. Martinez (0–1) || D. Hernandez (2) || 35,498 || 18–47
|- align="center" bgcolor="ffbbbb"
| 66 || June 16 || @ Giants || 6–3 || Lincecum (7–2) || Guthrie (3–8) || B. Wilson (18) || 38,485 || 18–48
|- align="center" bgcolor="ffbbbb"
| 67 || June 18 || @ Padres || 3–2 || Bell (3–0) || D. Hernandez (2–6) || || 25,167 || 18–49
|- align="center" bgcolor="bbffbb"
| 68 || June 19 || @ Padres || 5–4 || Millwood (1–8) || Richard (4–4) || Simón (7) || 28,183 || 19–49
|- align="center" bgcolor="ffbbbb"
| 69 || June 20 || @ Padres || 9–4 || Garland (7–5) || Arrieta (2–1) || || 28,029 || 19–50
|- align="center" bgcolor="ffbbbb"
| 70 || June 22 || Marlins || 10–4 || Sánchez (7–4) || Guthrie (3–9) || || 14,821 || 19–51
|- align="center" bgcolor="ffbbbb"
| 71 || June 23 || Marlins || 7–5 || Nolasco (6–6) || Matusz (2–8) || Núñez (16) || 17,720 || 19–52
|- align="center" bgcolor="bbffbb"
| 72 || June 24 || Marlins || 11–5 || Millwood (2–8) || Robertson (5–6) || || 15,397 || 20–52
|- align="center" bgcolor="bbffbb"
| 73 || June 25 || Nationals || 7–6 || Simón (2–1) || Clippard (8–4) || || 43,484 || 21–52
|- align="center" bgcolor="bbffbb"
| 74 || June 26 || Nationals || 6–5 || Berken (1–1) || S. Burnett (0–4) || Simón (8) || 28,635 || 22–52
|- align="center" bgcolor="bbffbb"
| 75 || June 27 || Nationals || 4–3 || D. Hernandez (3–6) || Clippard (8–5) || Simón (9) || 22,951 || 23–52
|- align="center" bgcolor="ffbbbb"
| 76 || June 29 || Athletics || 4–2 || Mazzaro (3–2) || Matusz (2–9) || Bailey (15) || 11,987 || 23–53
|- align="center" bgcolor="bbffbb"
| 77 || June 30 || Athletics || 9–6 || Albers (3–3) || Bowers (0–1) || Simón (10) || 21,392 || 24–53
|-

|- bgcolor="ffbbbb"
|- align="center" bgcolor="ffbbbb"
| 78 || July 1 || Athletics || 8–1 || Cahill (8–2) || Arrieta (2–2) || || 15,712 || 24–54
|- align="center" bgcolor="ffbbbb"
| 79 || July 2 || @ Red Sox || 3–2 || Wakefield (3–6) || Bergesen (3–5) || Papelbon (19) || 38,067 || 24–55
|- align="center" bgcolor="ffbbbb"
| 80 || July 3 || @ Red Sox || 9–3 || Lester (10–3) || Guthrie (3–10) || || 38,106 || 24–56
|- align="center" bgcolor="bbffbb"
| 81 || July 4 || @ Red Sox || 6–1 || Matusz (3–9) || Lackey (9–4) || || 37,742 || 25–56
|- align="center" bgcolor="ffbbbb"
| 82 || July 5 || @ Tigers || 12–9 || Bonine (4–0) || Hendrickson (1–4) || || 26,432 || 25–57
|- align="center" bgcolor="ffbbbb"
| 83 || July 6 || @ Tigers || 7–5 (11) || Perry (2–4) || D. Hernandez (3–7) || || 22,532 || 25–58
|- align="center" bgcolor="ffbbbb"
| 84 || July 7 || @ Tigers || 4–2 || Scherzer (6–6) || Bergesen (3–6) || Coke (1) || 22,837 || 25–59
|- align="center" bgcolor="bbffbb"
| 85 || July 8 || @ Rangers || 6–4 || D. Hernandez (4–7) || Francisco (6–4) || Simón (11) || 16,240 || 26–59
|- align="center" bgcolor="bbffbb"
| 86 || July 9 || @ Rangers || 7–6 (11) || Berken (2–1) || Nippert (3–4) || Simón (12) || 24,216 || 27–59
|- align="center" bgcolor="bbffbb"
| 87 || July 10 || @ Rangers || 6–1 || Tillman (1–3) || Lee (8–4) || || 41,093 || 28–59
|- align="center" bgcolor="bbffbb"
| 88 || July 11 || @ Rangers || 4–1 || Arrieta (3–2) || C. J. Wilson (7–5) || Simón (13) || 24,566 || 29–59
|- align="center" bgcolor="ffbbbb"
| 89 || July 16 || Blue Jays || 4–2 || Romero (7–6) || Bergesen (3–7) || Gregg (21) || 18,120 || 29–60
|- align="center" bgcolor="ffbbbb"
| 90 || July 17 || Blue Jays || 3–2 || Morrow (6–6) || Berken (2–2) || Camp (1) || 28,518 || 29–61
|- align="center" bgcolor="ffbbbb"
| 91 || July 18 || Blue Jays || 10–1 || Marcum (8–4) || Matusz (3–10) || || 14,032 || 29–62
|- align="center" bgcolor="ffbbbb"
| 92 || July 19 || Rays || 1–8 || Davis (7–9) || Tillman (1–4) || || 12,792 || 29–63
|- align="center" bgcolor="bbffbb"
| 93 || July 20 || Rays || 11–10 (13) || Uehara (1–0) || Cormier (3–2) || || 16,623 || 30–63
|- align="center" bgcolor="ffbbbb"
| 94 || July 21 || Rays || 4–5 || Shields (8–9) || Bergesen (3–8) || Soriano (24) || 19,286 || 30–64
|- align="center" bgcolor="ffbbbb"
| 95 || July 22 || Twins || 0–5 || Pavano (12–6) || Millwood (2–9) || || 20,108 || 30–65
|- align="center" bgcolor="bbffbb"
| 96 || July 23 || Twins || 3–2 || Guthrie (4–10) || Slama (0–1) || Simón (14) || 19,013 || 31–65
|- align="center" bgcolor="ffbbbb"
| 97 || July 24 || Twins || 2–7 || Baker (8–9) || Matusz (3–11) || || 22,299 || 31–66
|- align="center" bgcolor="ffbbbb"
| 98 || July 25 || Twins || 4–10 || Slowey (9–5) || Arrieta (3–3) || || 17,408 || 31–67
|- align="center" bgcolor="ffbbbb"
| 99 || July 26 || @ Blue Jays || 5–9 || Morrow (7–6) || Bergesen (3–9) || Purcey (1) || 17,422 || 31–68
|- align="center" bgcolor="ffbbbb"
| 100 || July 27 || @ Blue Jays || 2–8 || Romero (8–7) || Millwood (2–10) || || 16,862 || 31–69
|- align="center" bgcolor="ffbbbb"
| 101 || July 28 || @ Blue Jays || 0–5 || Mills (1–0) || Guthrie (4–11) || || 17,041 || 31–70
|- align="center" bgcolor="bbffbb"
| 102 || July 29 || @ Royals || 6–5 (11) || D. Hernandez (5–7) || Wood (0–2) || Simón (15) || 17,220 || 32–70
|- align="center" bgcolor="ffbbbb"
| 103 || July 30 || @ Royals || 5–7 || Wood (1–2) || Simón (2–2) || || 21,537 || 32–71
|- align="center" bgcolor="ffbbbb"
| 104 || July 31 || @ Royals || 3–4 || Greinke (7–10) || D. Hernandez (5–8) || Soria (28) || 25,055 || 32–72
|-

|- bgcolor="ffbbbb"
|- align="center" bgcolor="ffbbbb"
| 105 || August 1 || @ Royals || 5–4 || Chen (6–5) || Millwood (2–11) || Soria (29) || 14,662 || 32–73
|- align="center" bgcolor="bbffbb"
| 106 || August 3 || Angels || 6–3 || Guthrie (5–11) || Rodríguez (0–2) || || 16,723 || 33–73
|- align="center" bgcolor="bbffbb"
| 107 || August 4 || Angels || 9–7 || Matusz (4–11) || Santana (10–8) || Simón (16) || 13,467 || 34–73
|- align="center" bgcolor="bbffbb"
| 108 || August 5 || Angels || 5–4 || Berken (3–2) || F. Rodríguez (0–3) || || 17,362 || 35–73
|- align="center" bgcolor="bbffbb"
| 109 || August 6 || White Sox || 2–1 (10) || Simón (3–2) || Peña (3–2) || || 19, 687 || 36–73
|- align="center bgcolor="ffbbbb"
| 110 || August 7 || White Sox || 4–2 || Floyd (8–8) || Berken (3–3) || Putz (3) || 24, 929 || 36–74
|- align="center" bgcolor="bbffbb"
| 111 || August 8 || White Sox || 4–3 || Guthrie (6–11) || Buehrle (10–9) || Simón (17) || 18,283 || 37–74
|- align="center" bgcolor="bbffbb"
| 112 || August 9 || White Sox || 3–2 (10) || Albers (4–3) || Putz (5–3) || || 14,135 || 38–74
|- align="center" bgcolor="bbffbb"
| 113 || August 10 || @ Indians || 14–8 || Arrieta (4–3) || Masterson (6–11) || || 13,541 || 39–74 
|- align="center" bgcolor="bbffbb"
| 114 || August 11 || @ Indians || 3–1 || Bergesen (4–9) || Tomlin (1–2) || || 11,155 || 40–74
|- align="center" bgcolor="ffbbbb"
| 115 || August 12 || @ Indians || 4–1 || Gómez (3–0) || Millwood (2–12) || Perez (14) || 14,533 || 40–75
|- align="center bgcolor="bbffbb"
| 116 || August 13 || @ Rays || 5–0 || Guthrie (7–11) || Shields (10–11) || || 24,277 || 41–75
|- align="center" bgcolor="ffbbbb"
| 117 || August 14 || @ Rays || 7–3 || Sonnanstine (3–1) || Matusz (4–12) || || 36,189 || 41–76
|- align="center" bgcolor="ffbbbb"
| 118 || August 15 || @ Rays || 3–2 || Hellickson (3–0) || Arrieta (4–4) || Soriano (33) || 29,654 || 41–77
|- align="center" bgcolor="bbffbb"
| 119 || August 16 || Mariners || 5–4 || Albers (5–3) || White (0–1) || || 12,375 || 42–77
|- align="center" bgcolor="ffbbbb"
| 120 || August 17 || Mariners || 4–0 || French (2–3) || Millwood (2–13) || League (3) || 14,739 || 42–78
|- align="center" bgcolor="ffbbbb"
| 121 || August 18 || Mariners || 6–5 || Pauley (2–4) || Guthrie (7–12) || Aardsma (1) || 11,213 || 42–79
|- align="center" bgcolor="bbffbb"
| 122 || August 19 || Rangers || 4–0 || Matusz (5–12) || Lewis (9–10) || || 14,635 || 43–79
|- align="center" bgcolor="ffbbbb"
| 123 || August 20 || Rangers || 2–0 || C. J. Wilson (12–5) || Arrieta (4–5) || Feliz (30) || 18,751 || 43–80
|- align="center" bgcolor="bbffbb"
| 124 || August 21 || Rangers || 8–6 || Bergesen (5–9) || Lee (10–7) || Uehara (1) || 23,041 || 44–80
|- align="center" bgcolor="ffbbbb"
| 125 || August 22 || Rangers || 6–4 || Hunter (10–2) || Millwood (2–14) || Feliz (31) || 14,788 || 44–81
|- align="center" bgcolor="ffbbbb"
| 126 || August 24 || @ White Sox || 7–5 || Floyd (9–10) || Guthrie (7–13) || Jenks (24) || 26,263 || 44–82
|- align="center" bgcolor="bbffbb"
| 127 || August 25 || @ White Sox || 4–2 || Matusz (6–12) || Buehrle (12–10) || Uehara (2) || 23,733 || 45–82
|- align="center" bgcolor="ffbbbb"
| 128 || August 26 || @ White Sox || 8–0 || E. Jackson (2–0) || Arrieta (4–6) || || 23,898 || 45–83
|- align="center" bgcolor="bbffbb"
| 129 || August 27 || @ Angels || 3–1 || Bergesen (6–9) || Bell (1–4) || Uehara (3) || 43,127 || 46–83
|- align="center" bgcolor="bbffbb"
| 130 || August 28 || @ Angels || 5–0 || Millwood (3–14) || Kazmir (8–12) || || 43,127 || 47–83
|- align="center" bgcolor="bbffbb"
| 131 || August 29 || @ Angels || 1–0 || Guthrie (8–13) || Weaver (11–10) || Uehara (4) || 38,232 || 48–83
|- align="center" bgcolor="bbffbb"
| 132 || August 31 || Red Sox || 5–2 || Matusz (7–12) || Beckett (4–4) || Uehara (5) || 18,247 || 49–83
|-

|- bgcolor="ffbbbb"
|- align="center" bgcolor="ffbbbb"
| 133 || September 1 || Red Sox || 9–6 || Lester (15–8) || Hendrickson (1–5) || Papelbon (34) || 16,210 || 49–84
|- align="center" bgcolor="ffbbbb"
| 134 || September 2 || Red Sox || 6–4 || Matsuzaka (9–4) || Bergesen (6–10) || Papelbon (35) || 26,954 || 49–85
|- align="center" bgcolor="ffbbbb"
| 135 || September 3 || Rays || 4–1 || Garza (14–7) || Millwood (3–15) || Soriano (41) || 13,507 || 49–86
|- align="center" bgcolor="bbffbb"
| 136 || September 4 || Rays || 8–4 || Guthrie (9–13) || Shields (13–12) || || 18,943 || 50–86
|- align="center" bgcolor="bbffbb"
| 137 || September 5 || Rays || 8–7 || Simón (4–2) || Wheeler (2–2) || Uehara (6) || 28,268 || 51–86
|- align="center" bgcolor="bbffbb"
| 138 || September 6 || @ Yankees || 4–3 || Matusz (8–12) || A. J. Burnett (10–13) || Uehara (7) || 46,103 || 52–86
|- align="center" bgcolor="bbffbb"
| 139 || September 7 || @ Yankees || 6–2 || Arrieta (5–6) || Sabathia (19–6) || || 46,432 || 53–86
|- align="center" bgcolor="ffbbbb"
| 140 || September 8 || @ Yankees || 3–2 || Chamberlain (3–4) || Uehara (1–1) || || 44,163 || 53–87
|- align="center" bgcolor="bbffbb"
| 141 || September 10 || @ Tigers || 6–3 || D. Hernandez (6–8) || Coke (7–5) || Uehara (8) || 28,575 || 54–87
|- align="center" bgcolor="bbffbb"
| 142 || September 11 || @ Tigers || 5–3 || Guthrie (10–13) || Scherzer (10–10) || Uehara (9) || 28,139 || 55–87
|- align="center" bgcolor="ffbbbb"
| 143 || September 12 || @ Tigers || 6–2 || Verlander (16–8) || Gonzalez (0–3) || || 24,170 || 55–88
|- align="center" bgcolor="bbffbb"
| 144 || September 13 || Blue Jays || 6–2 (11) || D. Hernandez (7–8) || Tallet (2–6) || || 9,882 || 56–88
|- align="center" bgcolor="bbffbb"
| 145 || September 14 || Blue Jays || 11–3 || Arrieta (6–6) || Hill (0–2) || || 16,589 || 57–88
|- align="center" bgcolor="bbffbb"
| 146 || September 15 || Blue Jays || 3–1 || Bergesen (7–10) || Drabek (0–1)|| || 13,651 || 58–88 
|- align="center" bgcolor="ffbbbb"
| 147 || September 17 || Yankees || 4–3 || D. Robertson (4–4)|| Uehara (1–2) || Rivera (6) || 32,874 || 58–89 
|- align="center" bgcolor="ffbbbb"
| 148 || September 18 || Yankees || 11–3 || Sabathia (20–6) || Guthrie (10–14) || || 48,775 || 58–90
|- align="center" bgcolor="bbffbb"
| 149 || September 19 || Yankees || 4–3 (11) || Gonzalez (1–3) || D. Robertson (4–5) || || 39,537 || 59–90
|- align="center" bgcolor="bbffbb"
| 150 || September 20 || @ Red Sox || 4–2 || D. Hernandez (8–8) || Matsuzaka (9-6) || Uehara (10) || 37,560 || 60–90
|- align="center" bgcolor="bbffbb"
| 151 || September 21 || @ Red Sox || 9–1 || Bergesen (8–10) || Atchison (2–3) || || 37,464 || 61–90
|- align="center" bgcolor="ffbbbb"
| 152 || September 22 || @ Red Sox || 6–1 || Lackey (13–11) || Millwood (3–16) || || 37,729 || 61–91
|- align="center" bgcolor="ffbbbb"
| 153 || September 24 || @ Blue Jays || 6–4 || Cecil (14–7) || Tillman (1–5) || Carlson (1) || 13,412 || 61–92
|- align="center" bgcolor="ffbbbb"
| 154 || September 25 || @ Blue Jays || 5–4 (11) || Purcey (1–1) || Hendrickson (1–6) || || 21,504 || 61–93
|- align="center" bgcolor="ffbbbb"
| 155 || September 26 || @ Blue Jays || 5–2 || Marcum (13–8) || VandenHurk (0–1) || Frasor (4) || 17,831 || 61–94
|- align="center" bgcolor="bbffbb"
| 156 || September 27 || @ Rays || 4–0 || Matusz (9–12) || Davis (12–10) || || 12,446 || 62–94
|- align="center" bgcolor="ffbbbb"
| 157 || September 28 || @ Rays || 5–0 || Price (19–6) || Bergesen (8–11) || || 17,891 || 62–95
|- align="center" bgcolor="bbffbb"
| 158 || September 29 || @ Rays || 2–0 || Millwood (4–16) || Niemann (11–8) || Uehara (11) || 36,973 || 63–95
|-

|- bgcolor="ffbbbb"
|- align="center" bgcolor="bbffbb"
| 159 || October 1 || Tigers || 10–6 || Tillman (2–5) || Bonderman (8–10) || || || 64–95
|- align="center" bgcolor="bbffbb"
| 160 || October 1 || Tigers || 2–1 || Guthrie (11–14) || Porcello (10–12) || Uehara (12) || 20,870 || 65–95
|- align="center" bgcolor="bbffbb"
| 161 || October 2 || Tigers || 2–1 || Matusz (10–12) || Galarraga (4–9) || Uehara (13) || 35,332 || 66–95
|- align="center" bgcolor="ffbbbb"
| 162 || October 3 || Tigers || 4–2 || Schlereth (2–0) || Bergesen (8–12) || Valverde (26) || 23,914 || 66–96
|-

Player stats

Batting 
Note: G = Games played; AB = At bats; R = Runs scored; H = Hits; 2B = Doubles; 3B = Triples; HR = Home runs; RBI = Runs batted in; AVG = Batting average; SB = Stolen bases

Pitching 
Note: W = Wins; L = Losses; ERA = Earned run average; G = Games pitched; GS = Games started; SV = Saves; IP = Innings pitched; R = Runs allowed; ER = Earned runs allowed; BB = Walks allowed; K = Strikeouts

Farm system

References

External links 

 2010 Baltimore Orioles season at official site
 2010 Baltimore Orioles season at Baseball Reference

Baltimore Orioles seasons
Baltimore Orioles
Baltimore